Lajos Szabó (born 23 April 1956) is a Hungarian wrestler. He competed in the men's freestyle 52 kg at the 1980 Summer Olympics.

References

External links
 

1956 births
Living people
Hungarian male sport wrestlers
Olympic wrestlers of Hungary
Wrestlers at the 1980 Summer Olympics
People from Berettyóújfalu
Sportspeople from Hajdú-Bihar County